Allied Peoples Movement (APM) is a registered political party in Nigeria. The party was registered as a political party by the Independent National Electoral Commission in August, 2018.
The party endorsed President Muhammadu Buhari as its candidate in the 2015 Nigerian general elections.

References

Political parties in Nigeria